Goodmans LLP is a Canadian corporate law firm. First established in Toronto in 1917 by David Bertram Goodman, Goodmans LLP now has approximately 200 lawyers. The firm acts for Canada's largest corporations, financial institutions and multinationals, and was recognized two years in a row as the National Law Firm of the Year for Canada at the International Financial Law Review's Americas Awards. In September 2018, Goodmans was awarded the Americas Energy Tax Deal of the Year at the 13th annual Americas Tax Awards by International Tax Review in New York City.

Notable firm members and alumni 

 Edwin A. Goodman – One of the founding partners: Canadian lawyer and political figure
 Mike Harris – Former advisor: MPP and 22nd Premier of Ontario (1985–90)
 Gord Kirke – Counsel and later sports and entertainment lawyer
 Dale Lastman – Current chair of Goodmans
 Allan Leibel – Counsel and former co-chair: Canadian Olympic Sailor
 Bob Rae – Former partner: Member of Parliament, Leader of the Liberal Party of Canada (2011–13) and 21st Premier of Ontario (1990–95)
 Herb Solway – Former chair of the firm: Chairman of the Toronto Blue Jays

References

External links 
 Goodmans LLP

Law firms of Canada
Law firms established in 1917
1917 establishments in Ontario